Lucas  Hedlund (born August 18, 1998) is a Swedish footballer who plays for Superettan side Utsiktens BK.

Career

BK Häcken 
Hedlund scored his first senior goal
In the Swedish Cup in a 9-1 victory for BK Häcken on August 23, 2017 against Kvibille BK. Hedlund made his debut in the Allsvenskan for BK Hakken on November 11, 2018 against IFK Norrköping. However, at the end of the 2018 season he was released by the club.

Utsiktens
Hedlund signed a contract with Utsiktens BK ahead of the 2019 season. In 2020 Hedlund suffered a serious injury that restricted his play when a knee in the back caused a fractured vertebra and a herniated disc. Hedlund extended his contract with Utsiktens BK in January 2022. In April 2022 Headland scored the first goal for Utsiktens back in the Superettan following their promotion back for the 2022 season.

References

External links

1998 births
Living people
Swedish footballers
Association football forwards
Association football wingers
BK Häcken players
Allsvenskan players
Superettan players
Utsiktens BK players